{{Infobox military conflict
| conflict          = Philippine–American War
| image             =      
| caption           = Clockwise from top left: U.S. troops in Manila, Gregorio del Pilar and his troops around 1898, Americans guarding the Pasig River bridge in 1898, the Battle of Santa Cruz, Filipino soldiers at Malolos, the Battle of Quingua
| date              = Philippine–American War: February 4, 1899 – July 2, 1902
Moro Rebellion: February 4, 1899 – June 15, 1913
| place             = Philippines
| result            = American victory
 American occupation of the Philippines; dissolution of the First Philippine Republic
| territory         = The Philippines becomes an unincorporated territory of the United States and, later, a U.S. Commonwealth (until 1946).
| combatant1        = 1899–1902:
 Philippine Military Government
| combatant1a       = 1902–1913:
  Philippine Insular Government
| combatant2        = 1899–1902:
  Negros Republic
 Zamboanga Republic
Limited foreign support:
| combatant2a       = 1902–1906: Tagalog Republic1899–1905: Maguindanao Sultanate1899–1913:
| commander1        = 
| commander2        = 
| units1            = 
| units2            = 
| strength1         = 
| strength2         = ≈80,000–100,000regular and irregular,
| casualties1       = 4,200 killed, 2,818 wounded, several succumbed to disease 
| casualties2       = about 10,000 killed, (Emilio Aguinaldo estimate) 16,000–20,000 killed (American estimate)
| casualties3       = Filipino civilians: 200,000–1,000,000 died, most because of famine and disease; including 150,000-200,000 dead from cholera.
| notes             = 
}}

The Philippine–American War, known alternatively as the Philippine Insurrection, Filipino–American War, or Tagalog Insurgency, was fought between the First Philippine Republic and the United States from February 4, 1899, until July 2, 1902. Tensions arose after the United States annexed the Philippines under the Treaty of Paris at the conclusion of the Spanish–American War rather than acknowledging the Philippines' declaration of independence, developing into the eruption of open battle. The war can be seen as a continuation of the Philippine struggle for independence that began in 1896 with the Philippine Revolution against Spanish rule.

Fighting between the forces of the United States and the forces of the Philippine Republic broke out on February 4, 1899, in what became known as the 1899 Battle of Manila. On June 2, 1899, the First Philippine Republic officially declared war against the United States. The Philippine President Emilio Aguinaldo was captured on March 23, 1901, and the war was officially declared ended by the American government on July 2, 1902, with a victory for the United States. However, some Philippine groups—some led by veterans of the Katipunan, a Philippine revolutionary society that had launched the revolution against Spain—continued to battle the American forces for several more years. Among those leaders was Macario Sakay, a veteran Katipunan member who established (or re-established) the Tagalog Republic in 1902 along Katipunan lines in contrast to Aguinaldo's Republic, with himself as president. Other groups, including the Muslim Moro peoples of the southern Philippines and quasi-Catholic Pulahan religious movements, continued hostilities in remote areas. The resistance in the Moro-dominated provinces in the south, called the Moro Rebellion by the Americans, ended with their final defeat at the Battle of Bud Bagsak on June 15, 1913.

The war resulted in at least 200,000 Filipino civilian deaths, mostly due to diseases such as cholera and to famine. Some estimates for total civilian dead reach up to a million. Atrocities were committed during the conflict by both sides, including torture, mutilation, and executions. In retaliation for Filipino guerrilla warfare tactics, the U.S. carried out reprisals and scorched earth campaigns and forcibly relocated many civilians to concentration camps, where thousands died. The war and subsequent occupation by the U.S. changed the culture of the islands, leading to the rise of Protestantism and disestablishment of the Catholic Church and the introduction of English to the islands as the primary language of government, education, business, and industry.

In 1902, the United States Congress passed the Philippine Organic Act, which provided for the creation of the Philippine Assembly, with members to be elected by Filipino males (women did not have the right to vote until a 1937 plebiscite). This act was superseded by the 1916 Jones Act (Philippine Autonomy Act), which contained the first formal and official declaration of the United States government's commitment to eventually grant independence to the Philippines. The 1934 Tydings–McDuffie Act (Philippine Independence Act) created the Commonwealth of the Philippines the following year, increasing self-governance, and established a process towards full independence (originally scheduled for 1944, but delayed by World War II and the Japanese occupation of the Philippines). The United States eventually granted full Philippine independence in 1946 through the Treaty of Manila.

Background

Philippine Revolution

Andrés Bonifacio was a warehouseman and clerk from Manila. On July 7, 1892, he established the Katipunan—a revolutionary organization formed to gain independence from Spanish colonial rule by armed revolt. In August 1896, the Katipunan was discovered by the Spanish authorities and thus launched its revolution. Fighters in Cavite province won early victories. One of the most influential and popular leaders from Cavite was Emilio Aguinaldo, mayor of Cavite El Viejo (modern-day Kawit), who gained control of much of the eastern portion of Cavite province. Eventually, Aguinaldo and his faction gained control of the leadership of the Philippine revolution. After Aguinaldo was elected president of a revolutionary government superseding the Katipunan at the Tejeros Convention on March 22, 1897, his government had Bonifacio executed for treason after a show trial on May 10, 1897.

Aguinaldo's exile and return

By late 1897, after a succession of defeats for the revolutionary forces, the Spanish had regained control over most of the Philippine territory the rebels had taken. Aguinaldo and Spanish Governor-General Fernando Primo de Rivera entered into armistice negotiations while Spanish forces surrounded Aguinaldo's hideout and base in  Biak-na-Bato in Bulacan province, and Aguinaldo reorganized his "Republic of the Philippines" in the meantime. On December 14, 1897, an agreement was reached in which the Spanish colonial government would pay Aguinaldo $MXN800,000 in Manila—in three installments if Aguinaldo would go into exile outside of the Philippines.

Upon receiving the first of the installments, Aguinaldo and 25 of his closest associates left their headquarters at Biak-na-Bato and made their way to Hong Kong, according to the terms of the agreement. Before his departure, Aguinaldo denounced the Philippine Revolution, exhorted Filipino rebel combatants to disarm, and declared those who continued hostilities and waging war to be bandits. Despite Aguinaldo's denunciation, some of the revolutionaries continued their armed revolt against the Spanish colonial government. According to Aguinaldo, the Spanish never paid the second and third installments of the agreed-upon sum.

On April 22, 1898, while in exile, Aguinaldo had a private meeting in Singapore with United States Consul E. Spencer Pratt, after which he decided to again take up the mantle of leadership in the Philippine Revolution. According to Aguinaldo, Pratt had communicated with Commodore George Dewey (commander of the Asiatic Squadron of the United States Navy) by telegram, and passed assurances from Dewey to Aguinaldo that the United States would recognize the independence of the Philippines under the protection of the United States Navy. Pratt reportedly stated that there was no necessity for entering into a formal written agreement because the word of the Admiral and of the United States Consul were equivalent to the official word of the United States government. With these assurances, Aguinaldo agreed to return to the Philippines.

Pratt later contested Aguinaldo's account of these events, and denied any "dealings of a political character" with the leader. Admiral Dewey also refuted Aguinaldo's account, stating that he had promised nothing regarding the future:

Filipino historian Teodoro Agoncillo writes of "American apostasy", saying that it was the Americans who first approached Aguinaldo in Hong Kong and Singapore to persuade him to cooperate with Dewey in wresting power from the Spanish. Conceding that Dewey may not have promised Aguinaldo American recognition and Philippine independence (Dewey had no authority to make such promises), he writes that Dewey and Aguinaldo had an informal alliance to fight a common enemy, that Dewey breached that alliance by making secret arrangements for a Spanish surrender to American forces, and that he treated Aguinaldo badly after the surrender was secured. Agoncillo concludes that the American attitude towards Aguinaldo "... showed that they came to the Philippines not as a friend, but as an enemy masking as a friend."

After four months in exile, Aguinaldo decided to resume his role in the Philippine Revolution. He departed from Singapore aboard the steamship Malacca on April 27, 1898. He arrived in Hong Kong on May 1, the day that US Commodore George Dewey's naval forces destroyed Rear-Admiral Patricio Montojo's Spanish Pacific Squadron at the Battle of Manila Bay. Aguinaldo departed Hong Kong aboard the USRC McCulloch on May 17, arriving in Cavite on May 19.

Less than three months after Aguinaldo's return, the Philippine Revolutionary Army had conquered nearly all of the Philippines. With the exception of Manila, which was surrounded by revolutionary forces some 12,000 strong, the Filipinos controlled the Philippines. Aguinaldo turned over 15,000 Spanish prisoners to the Americans, offering them valuable intelligence. Aguinaldo declared independence at his house in Cavite El Viejo on June 12, 1898.

The Philippine Declaration of Independence was not recognized by either the United States or Spain, and the Spanish government ceded the Philippines to the United States in the 1898 Treaty of Paris, which was signed on December 10, 1898, in consideration for an indemnity for Spanish expenses and assets lost.

Upon his return in May 1898, Aguinaldo established a "Dictatorial Government" with himself as "Dictator", under which Philippine independence was declared. About a month later, he established a "Revolutionary Government" in its place and retook the title of "President". He then organized a congress in Malolos, Bulacan to draft a constitution. This led to the formal establishment of the "Philippine Republic" by late January 1899. This government was later known as the First Philippine Republic, as the current Republic of the Philippines considers itself the fifth, and also as the "Malolos Republic" after its capital. Aguinaldo, who had again been re-established as president (by the Malolos congress) on January 1,  is today officially considered as "the first President of the Republic of the Philippines" by the current Philippine government based on his tenure for the First Republic.

Origins of the conflict
Battle of Manila

On July 9, General Anderson informed Major General Henry Clark Corbin, the Adjutant General of the U.S. Army, that Aguinaldo "has declared himself Dictator and President, and is trying to take Manila without our assistance", opining that that would not be probable but, if done, would allow him to antagonize any U.S. attempt to establish a provisional government. On July 15, Aguinaldo issued three organic decrees assuming civil authority of the Philippines.

On July 18, General Anderson wrote that he suspected Aguinaldo to be secretly negotiating with the Spanish authorities. In a July 21 letter to the Adjutant General, General Anderson wrote that Aguinaldo had "put in operation an elaborate system of military government, under his assumed authority as Dictator, and has prohibited any supplies being given us, except by his order," and that Anderson had written to Aguinaldo that the requisitions on the country for necessary items must be filled, and that he must aid in having them filled.

On July 24, Aguinaldo wrote a letter to General Anderson in effect warning him not to disembark American troops in places conquered by the Filipinos from the Spaniards without first communicating in writing the places to be occupied and the object of the occupation. Murat Halstead, official historian of the Philippine Expedition, writes that General Merritt remarked shortly after his arrival on June 25, 

U.S. commanders suspected that Aguinaldo and his forces were informing the Spanish of American movements. U.S. Army Major John R. M. Taylor later wrote, after translating and analyzing insurgent documents,

The secret agreement made by Commodore Dewey and Brigadier General Wesley Merritt with newly arrived Spanish Governor-General Fermín Jáudenes and with his predecessor Basilio Augustín was for the Spanish forces to surrender only to the Americans, not to the Filipino revolutionaries. To save face, the Spanish surrender would take place after a mock battle in Manila which the Spanish would lose; the Filipinos would not be allowed to enter the city. On the eve of the battle, Brigadier General Thomas M. Anderson telegraphed Aguinaldo, "Do not let your troops enter Manila without the permission of the American commander. On this side of the Pasig River you will be under fire." On August 13, American forces captured the city of Manila from the Spanish.

Before the attack on Manila, American and Filipino forces had been allies against Spain in all but name. After the capture of Manila, Spanish and Americans were in a partnership that excluded the Filipino insurgents. Fighting between American and Filipino troops had almost broken out as the former moved in to dislodge the latter from strategic positions around Manila on the eve of the attack. Aguinaldo had been told bluntly by the Americans that his army could not participate and would be fired upon if it crossed into the city. The insurgents were infuriated at being denied triumphant entry into their own capital, but Aguinaldo bided his time. Relations continued to deteriorate, however, as it became clear to Filipinos that the Americans were in the islands to stay.

End of the Spanish–American War

On August 12, 1898, The New York Times reported that a peace protocol had been signed in Washington that afternoon between the U.S. and Spain, suspending hostilities between the two nations. The full text of the protocol was not made public until November 5, but Article III read: "The United States will occupy and hold the City, Bay, and Harbor of Manila, pending the conclusion of a treaty of peace, which shall determine the control, disposition, and government of the Philippines." After conclusion of this agreement, U.S. President McKinley proclaimed a suspension of hostilities with Spain.

In a clash at Cavite between United States soldiers and insurgents on August 25, 1898, George Hudson of the Utah regiment was killed, Corporal William Anderson was mortally wounded, and four troopers of the Fourth Cavalry were slightly wounded. This provoked General Anderson to send Aguinaldo a letter saying, "In order to avoid the very serious misfortune of an encounter between our troops, I demand your immediate withdrawal with your guard from Cavite. One of my men has been killed and three wounded by your people. This is positive and does not admit of explanation or delay." Internal insurgent communications reported that the Americans were drunk at the time. Halstead writes that Aguinaldo expressed his regret and promised to punish the offenders. In internal insurgent communications, Apolinario Mabini initially proposed to investigate and punish any offenders identified. Aguinaldo modified this, ordering, "... say that he was not killed by your soldiers, but by them themselves [the Americans] since they were drunk according to your telegram". An insurgent officer in Cavite at the time reported on his record of services that he: "took part in the movement against the Americans on the afternoon of the 24th of August, under the orders of the commander of the troops and the adjutant of the post."

Elections were held by the Revolutionary Government between June and September 10, resulting in the seating of a legislature known as the Malolos Congress. In a session between September 15 and November 13, 1898, the Malolos Constitution was adopted. It was promulgated on January 21, 1899, creating the First Philippine Republic with Emilio Aguinaldo as president.

Article V of the peace protocol signed on August 12 had mandated negotiations to conclude a treaty of peace to begin in Paris not later than October 1, 1898. President McKinley sent a five-man commission, initially instructed to demand no more than Luzon, Guam, and Puerto Rico; which would have provided a limited U.S. empire of pinpoint colonies to support a global fleet and provide communication links. In Paris, the commission was besieged with advice, particularly from American generals and European diplomats, to demand the entire Philippine archipelago. The unanimous recommendation was that "it would certainly be cheaper and more humane to take the entire Philippines than to keep only part of it." On October 28, 1898, McKinley wired the commission that "cessation of Luzon alone, leaving the rest of the islands subject to Spanish rule, or to be the subject of future contention, cannot be justified on political, commercial, or humanitarian grounds. The cessation must be the whole archipelago or none. The latter is wholly inadmissible, and the former must therefore be required." The Spanish negotiators were furious over the "immodist demands of a conqueror", but their wounded pride was assuaged by an offer of twenty million dollars for "Spanish improvements" to the islands. The Spaniards capitulated, and on December 10, 1898, the U.S. and Spain signed the Treaty of Paris, formally ending the Spanish–American War. In Article III, Spain ceded the Philippine archipelago to the United States, as follows: "Spain cedes to the United States the archipelago known as the Philippine Islands, and comprehending the islands lying within the following line: [... geographic description elided ...]. The United States will pay to Spain the sum of twenty million dollars ($20,000,000) within three months after the exchange of the ratifications of the present treaty."Multiple sources:

In the U.S., there was a movement for Philippine independence; some said that the U.S. had no right to a land where many of the people wanted self-government. In 1898 Andrew Carnegie, an industrialist and steel magnate, offered to pay the U.S. government $20 million to give the Philippines its independence.

Benevolent assimilation

On December 21, 1898, President William McKinley issued a proclamation of "benevolent assimilation, substituting the mild sway of justice and right for arbitrary rule" for "the greatest good of the governed." Referring to the Treaty of Paris, it said that "as a result of the victories of American arms, the future control, disposition, and government of the Philippine Islands are ceded to the United States." It enjoined the military commander (General Otis) to make known to the inhabitants of the Philippine Islands that "in succeeding to the sovereignty of Spain" the authority of the United States "is to be exerted for the securing of the persons and property of the people of the islands and for the confirmation of all their private rights and relations." The proclamation specified that "it will be the duty of the commander of the forces of occupation to announce and proclaim in the most public manner that we come, not as invaders or conquerors, but as friends, to protect the natives in their homes, in their employments, and in their personal and religious rights".

The Spanish yielded Iloilo to the insurgents on December 26. An American brigade under General Marcus P. Miller sailed to iloilo on December 26, arriving on the 28th and opening communications with the insurgents. A Filipino official styling himself "Presidente Lopez of the Federal Government of the Visayas", who stated landing required "express orders from the central government of Luzon" refused Miller's force permission to land. News reached Washington from Manila on January 1, 1899, that Miller's forces had been refused permission to land.

Major General Elwell Stephen Otis, who had been appointed Military Governor of the Philippines, had delayed publication of McKinley's proclamation. On January 4, Otis published an amended version edited so as not to convey the meanings of the terms sovereignty, protection, and right of cessation, which were present in the original version. On January 6, 1899, General Otis was quoted in The New York Times as expressing himself as convinced that the U.S. government intends to seek the establishment of a liberal government, in which the people will be as fully represented as the maintenance of law and order will permit, susceptible of development, on lines of increased representation, and the bestowal of increased powers, into a government as free and independent as is enjoyed by the most favored provinces in the world.

Unknown to Otis, the War Department had also sent an enciphered copy of the Benevolent Assimilation proclamation to General Miller for informational purposes. Miller assumed that it was for distribution and, unaware that a politically bowdlerized version had been sent to Aguinaldo, published it in both Spanish and Tagalog translations which eventually made their way to Aguinaldo. Even before Aguinaldo received the unaltered version and observed the changes in the copy he had received from Otis, he was upset that Otis had altered his own title to "Military Governor of the Philippines" from "... in the Philippines". Aguinaldo did not miss the significance of the alteration, which Otis had made without authorization from Washington.

The original proclamation was given by supporters to Aguinaldo who, on January 5, issued a counter-proclamation:

After some copies of that proclamation had been distributed, Aguinaldo ordered the recall of undistributed copies and issued another proclamation, which was published the same day in El Heraldo de la Revolucion, the official newspaper of the Philippine Republic. There, he said partly,

Otis, taking these two proclamations as tantamount to war, strengthened American observation posts and alerted his troops. On the other hand, Aguinaldo's proclamations energized the masses with a vigorous determination to fight what was perceived as an ally turned enemy. In the tense atmosphere, some 40,000 Filipinos fled Manila within a period of 15 days.

Meanwhile, Felipe Agoncillo, who had been commissioned by the Philippine Revolutionary Government as Minister Plenipotentiary to negotiate treaties with foreign governments, and who had unsuccessfully sought to be seated at the negotiations between the U.S. and Spain in Paris, was now in Washington. On January 6, he filed a request for an interview with the President to discuss affairs in the Philippines. The next day the government officials were surprised to learn that messages to General Otis to deal mildly with the rebels and not to force a conflict had become known to Agoncillo, and cabled by him to Aguinaldo. At the same time came Aguinaldo's protest against General Otis signing himself "Military Governor of the Philippines".

On January 8, Agoncillo gave out this statement:

The Filipino committees in London (capital of U.K.), Paris (capital of France) and Madrid (capital of Spain) about this time telegraphed to President McKinley as follows:

On January 8, Aguinaldo received the following message from Teodoro Sandiko:

The New York Times reported on January 8, that two Americans who had been guarding a waterboat in Iloilo had been attacked, one fatally, and that insurgents were threatening to destroy the business section of the city by fire; and on January 10 that a peaceful solution to the Iloilo issues may result but that Aguinaldo had issued a proclamation threatening to drive the Americans from the islands.

By January 10, insurgents were ready to assume the offensive, but desired, if possible, to provoke the Americans into firing the first shot. They made no secret of their desire for conflict, but increased their hostile demonstrations and pushed their lines forward into forbidden territory. Their attitude is well illustrated by the following extract from a telegram sent by Colonel Cailles to Aguinaldo on January 10, 1899:

Aguinaldo approved the hostile attitude of Cailles, for there is a reply in his handwriting which reads:

On January 31, 1899, The Minister of Interior of the revolutionary First Philippine Republic, Teodoro Sandiko, signed a decree saying that President Aguinaldo had directed that all idle lands be planted to provide food for the people, in view of impending war with the Americans.

War

Outbreak of war
On the evening of February 4, Private William W. Grayson—a sentry of the 1st Nebraska Infantry Regiment—fired the first shots of the war at the corner of Sociego and Silencio Streets, in Santa Mesa. According to Grayson's account, they told four Fillipino soldiers to "Halt!" and, when the men responded by cocking their rifles, they fired at them and then retreated. Grayson claimed that he killed a Filipino lieutenant and another Filipino soldier, but neither American nor Filipino official reports mentioned anyone being hit. According to Quennie Ann J. Palafox, writing for the National Historical Commission of the Philippines, two unarmed soldiers were killed. Later that day, Aguinaldo declared "That peace and friendly relations with the Americans be broken and that the latter be treated as enemies, within the limits prescribed by the laws of war." The outbreak of violence triggered the 1899 Battle of Manila. The following day, Filipino General Isidoro Torres came through the lines under a flag of truce to deliver a message from Aguinaldo to General Otis that the fighting had begun accidentally, and that Aguinaldo wished for the hostilities to cease immediately and for the establishment of a neutral zone between the two opposing forces. Otis dismissed these overtures, and replied that the "fighting, having begun, must go on to the grim end". On February 5, General Arthur MacArthur ordered his troops to advance against Filipino troops, beginning a full-scale armed clash. The first Filipino fatality of the war was Corporal Anastacio Felix of the 4th Company, Morong Battalion under Captain Serapio Narváez. The battalion commander was Colonel Luciano San Miguel. On June 2, 1899, the First Philippine Republic issued a declaration of war on the United States, which was publicly proclaimed on that same day by Pedro Paterno, president of the National Assembly.

American war strategy
Annexation of the Philippines by the United States was justified by those in the U.S. government and media in the name of liberating and protecting the peoples in the former Spanish colonies. Senator Albert J. Beveridge, one of the most prominent American imperialists at the time, said: "Americans altruistically went to war with Spain to liberate Cubans, Puerto Ricans, and Filipinos from their tyrannical yoke. If they lingered on too long in the Philippines, it was to protect the Filipinos from European predators waiting in the wings for an American withdrawal and to tutor them in American-style democracy."

On February 11, 1899, one week after the first shots of the war were fired, the city of Iloilo was bombarded by American naval forces from the USS Petrel and the USS Baltimore. Filipino forces set the town on fire before retreating. The city was captured by ground forces led by Brigadier General Marcus Miller, with no loss of American lives. 25 to 30 Filipinos were wounded. The "native" part of the city was almost entirely destroyed.

Months later, after finally securing Manila from the Filipino forces, American forces moved northward, engaging in combat at the brigade and battalion level in pursuit of the fleeing insurgent forces and their commanders. In response to the use of guerrilla warfare tactics by Filipino forces, beginning in September 1899, American military strategy shifted to suppression of the resistance. Tactics became focused on the control of key areas with internment and segregation of the civilian population in "zones of protection" from the guerrilla population. (This is considered to foreshadow the Strategic Hamlet Program that the South Vietnamese government, with U.S. support, used decades later during the Vietnam War). Due to disruption of war and unsanitary conditions, many of the interned civilians died from dysentery.

General Otis gained notoriety for some of his actions in the Philippines. Although his superiors in Washington had directed Otis to avoid military conflict, he did very little to prevent the breakout of war. Otis refused to accept anything but unconditional surrender from the Philippine Army. He often made major military decisions without first consulting leadership in Washington. He acted aggressively in dealing with the Filipinos under the assumption that their resistance would collapse quickly. Even after this assumption proved false, he continued to insist that the insurgency had been defeated, and that the remaining casualties were caused by "isolated bands of outlaws".

Otis also was active in suppressing information about American military tactics from the media. When letters describing American atrocities reached the American media, Otis had each press clipping forwarded to the original writer's commanding officer, who would convince or force the soldier to write a retraction of the original statements.

Filipino war strategy
Estimates of the Filipino forces vary between 80,000 and 100,000, with tens of thousands of auxiliaries. Most of the forces were armed only with bolo knives, bows and arrows, spears and other primitive weapons, which were vastly inferior to the guns and other weapons of the American forces.

A fairly rigid caste system existed in the Philippines during the Spanish colonial era. The goal, or end-state, sought by the First Philippine Republic was a sovereign, independent, stable nation led by an oligarchy composed of members of the educated class (known as the ilustrado class). Local chieftains, landowners, businessmen and cabezas de barangay were the principales who controlled local politics. The war was at its peak when ilustrados, principales, and peasants were unified in opposition to annexation by the United States. The peasants, who represented the majority of the fighting forces, had interests different from their ilustrado leaders and the principales of their villages. Coupled with the ethnic and geographic fragmentation, aligning the interests of people from different social castes was a daunting task. The challenge for Aguinaldo and his generals was to sustain unified Filipino public opposition; this was the revolutionaries' strategic center of gravity.

The Filipino operational center of gravity was the ability to sustain its force of 100,000 irregulars in the field. The Filipino general Francisco Macabulos described the Filipinos' war aim as, "not to vanquish the U.S. Army but to inflict on them constant losses." In the early stages of the war, the Philippine Revolutionary Army employed the conventional military tactics typical of an organized armed resistance. The hope was to inflict enough American casualties to result in McKinley's defeat by William Jennings Bryan in the 1900 presidential election. They hoped that Bryan, who held strong anti-imperialist views, would withdraw the American forces from the Philippines.

McKinley's election victory in 1900 was demoralizing for the insurgents, and convinced many Filipinos that the United States would not depart quickly. Coupled with a series of devastating losses on the battlefield against American forces equipped with superior technology and training, Aguinaldo became convinced that he needed to change his approach. Beginning on September 14, 1899, Aguinaldo accepted the advice of General Gregorio del Pilar and authorized the use of guerrilla warfare tactics in subsequent military operations in Bulacan.

Guerrilla war phase
For most of 1899, the revolutionary leadership had viewed guerrilla warfare strategically only as a tactical option of final recourse, not as a means of operation which better suited their disadvantaged situation. On November 13, 1899, Emilio Aguinaldo decreed that guerrilla war would henceforth be the strategy. This made American occupation of the Philippine archipelago all the more difficult over the next few years. During the first four months of the guerrilla war, the Americans had nearly 500 casualties. The Philippine Army began staging bloody ambushes and raids, such as the guerrilla victories at Paye, Catubig, Makahambus, Pulang Lupa, Balangiga and Mabitac. At first, it seemed that the Filipinos might be able to fight the Americans to a stalemate and force them to withdraw. President McKinley considered withdrawal when the guerrilla raids began.

Martial law
On December 20, 1900, General Arthur MacArthur Jr., who had succeeded Elwell Otis as U.S. Military Governor on May 5, placed the Philippines under martial law, invoking U.S. Army General Order 100. He announced that guerrilla abuses would no longer be tolerated and outlined the rights which would govern the U.S. Army's treatment of guerrillas and civilians. In particular, guerrillas who wore no uniform but peasant dress and shifted from civilian to military status would be held accountable; secret committees that collected revolutionary taxes and those accepting U.S. protection in occupied towns while assisting guerrillas would be treated as "war rebels or war traitors". Filipino leaders who continued to work towards Philippine independence were deported to Guam.

Decline and fall of the First Philippine Republic

The Philippine Army continued suffering defeats from the better armed United States Army during the conventional warfare phase, forcing Aguinaldo to continually change his base of operations throughout the course of the war.

On March 23, 1901, General Frederick Funston and his troops captured Aguinaldo in Palanan, Isabela, with the help of some Filipinos (called the Macabebe Scouts after their home locale) who had joined the Americans' side. The Americans pretended to be captives of the Scouts, who were dressed in Philippine Army uniforms. Once Funston and his "captors" entered Aguinaldo's camp, they immediately fell upon the guards and quickly overwhelmed them and the weary Aguinaldo.

On April 1, 1901, at the Malacañan Palace in Manila, Aguinaldo swore an oath accepting the authority of the United States over the Philippines and pledging his allegiance to the American government. On April 19, he issued a Proclamation of Formal Surrender to the United States, telling his followers to lay down their weapons and give up the fight.

"Let the stream of blood cease to flow; let there be an end to tears and desolation," Aguinaldo said. "The lesson which the war holds out and the significance of which I realized only recently, leads me to the firm conviction that the complete termination of hostilities and a lasting peace are not only desirable but also absolutely essential for the well-being of the Philippines."

The capture of Aguinaldo dealt a severe blow to the Filipino cause, but not as much as the Americans had hoped. General Miguel Malvar took over the leadership of the Filipino government. He originally had taken a defensive stance against the Americans, but now launched all-out offensive against the American-held towns in the Batangas region. General Vicente Lukbán in Samar, and other army officers, continued the war in their respective areas.

General Bell relentlessly pursued Malvar and his men, forcing the surrender of many of the Filipino soldiers. Finally, Malvar surrendered, along with his sick wife and children and some of his officers, on April 16, 1902. By the end of the month nearly 3,000 of Malvar's men had also surrendered. With the surrender of Malvar, the Filipino war effort began to dwindle even further.

Establishment of civil government

On March 3, 1901, the U.S. Congress passed the Army Appropriation Act containing (along with the Platt Amendment on Cuba) the Spooner Amendment which provided the president with legislative authority to establish of a civil government in the Philippines. Up until this time, the president had been administering the Philippines by virtue of his war powers. On July 1, 1901, civil government was inaugurated with William H. Taft as the civil governor. Later, on February 3, 1903, the U.S. Congress would change the title of Civil Governor to Governor-General.

A highly centralized public school system was installed in 1901, using English as the medium of instruction. This created a heavy shortage of teachers, and the Philippine Commission authorized the secretary of public instruction to bring to the Philippines 600 teachers from the U.S.—the so-called Thomasites. Free primary instruction that trained the people for the duties of citizenship and avocation was enforced by the Taft Commission per instructions of President McKinley. Also, the Catholic Church was disestablished, and a considerable amount of church land was purchased and redistributed.

An anti-sedition law was established in 1901, followed by an anti-brigandage law in 1902.

Official end of the war

The Philippine Organic Act—approved on July 1, 1902—approved, ratified, and confirmed McKinley's previous executive order establishing the Second Philippine Commission. The act also stipulated that a bicameral legislature would be established composed of a popularly elected lower house, the Philippine Assembly, and an upper house consisting of the appointed Philippine Commission. The act also provided for extending the United States Bill of Rights to Filipinos. On July 2, the United States Secretary of War telegraphed that since the insurrection against the United States had ended and provincial civil governments had been established throughout most of the Philippine archipelago, the office of military governor was terminated. On July 4, Theodore Roosevelt, who had succeeded to the U.S. presidency after the assassination of President McKinley on September 5, 1901, proclaimed a full and complete pardon and amnesty to all persons in the Philippine archipelago who had participated in the conflict.Ch.9

On April 9, 2002, Philippine President Gloria Macapagal Arroyo proclaimed that the Philippine–American War had ended on April 16, 1902, with the surrender of General Miguel Malvar. She declared the centennial anniversary of that date as a national working holiday and as a special non-working holiday in the province of Batangas and in the cities of Batangas, Lipa and Tanauan.

The Kiram-Bates Treaty secured the Sultanate of Sulu. American forces also established control over interior mountainous areas that had resisted Spanish conquest.

Casualties

Casualties during the war were much greater among Filipinos than among Americans. The United States Department of State states that the war "resulted in the death of over 4,200 American and over 20,000 Filipino combatants", and that "as many as 200,000 Filipino civilians died from violence, famine, and disease". The total number of Filipinos who died remains a matter of debate. Modern sources cite a figure of 200,000 total Filipino civilians dead, with most losses attributable to famine, and disease. A cholera epidemic at the war's end killed between 150,000 and 200,000 people.

Some estimates reach 1,000,000 dead. In 1903 the population of the Philippines was recounted by American authorities to fulfill Act 467. The survey yielded 7,635,426 people, including 56,138 who were foreign-born. In 1887, a Spanish census recorded a population of 5,984,717 excluding non-Christians.

Rudolph Rummel estimates that 16,000 to 20,000 Filipino soldiers and 34,000 civilians were killed, with up to an additional 200,000 civilian deaths, mostly from a cholera epidemic. Rummel claims that 128,000 Filipinos were killed by the U.S. in democide and 13,000 were killed by Filipinos in democide.

Atrocities
American atrocities

Throughout the war, numerous atrocities were committed by the U.S. military, including the targeting of civilians. American soldiers and other witnesses sent letters home which described some of these atrocities. For example, In November 1901, the Manila correspondent of the Philadelphia Ledger wrote:

Reports were received from soldiers returning from the Philippines that, upon entering a village, American soldiers would ransack every house and church and rob the inhabitants of everything of value, while those who approached the battle line waving a flag of truce were fired upon.

Some of the authors were critical of leaders such as General Otis and the overall conduct of the war. When some of these letters were published in newspapers, they would become national news, which would force the War Department to investigate. Two such letters included:
 A soldier from New York: "The town of Titatia was surrendered to us a few days ago, and two companies occupy the same. Last night one of our boys was found shot and his stomach cut open. Immediately orders were received from General Wheaton to burn the town and kill every native in sight; which was done to a finish. About 1,000 men, women and children were reported killed. I am probably growing hard-hearted, for I am in my glory when I can sight my gun on some dark skin and pull the trigger."
 Corporal Sam Gillis: "We make everyone get into his house by seven p.m., and we only tell a man once. If he refuses we shoot him. We killed over 300 natives the first night. They tried to set the town on fire. If they fire a shot from the house we burn the house down and every house near it, and shoot the natives, so they are pretty quiet in town now."

General Otis' investigation of the content of these letters consisted of sending a copy of them to the author's superior and having him force the author to write a retraction. If a soldier refused to do so, as Private Charles Brenner of the Kansas regiment did, he was court-martialed. In the case of Private Brenner, the charge was "for writing and conniving at the publication of an article which...contains willful falsehoods concerning himself and a false charge against Captain Bishop." Not all such letters that discussed atrocities were intended to criticize General Otis or American actions. Many portrayed U.S. actions as the result of Filipino provocation and thus entirely justified.thumb|Emilio Aguinaldo's quarters in Manila following his capture by the Americans.
Following Aguinaldo's capture by the Americans on March 23, 1901, Miguel Malvar assumed command of the Philippine revolutionary forces. Batangas and Laguna provinces were the main focus of Malvar's forces at this point in the war, and they continued to employ guerrilla warfare tactics. Vicente Lukbán remained active as guerrilla commander in Samar. Enraged by a guerrilla massacre of U.S. troops on the Island of Samar in September 1901, General Jacob H. Smith retaliated by ordering an indiscriminate attack upon its inhabitants, openly disregarding General Order 100, and issuing an order to "kill everyone over the age of ten" and turn the island into a "howling wilderness". Major Littleton Waller countermanded the order to his own men saying, "we are not making war on women and children". Still, 2,000 to 2,500 Filipino civilians were killed in the March across Samar expedition. This became a caption in the New York Journal-American cartoon on May 5, 1902. Smith was eventually court-martialed by the American military and forced to retire.Fritz, David L, Before "The Howling Wilderness": The Military Career of Jacob Heard Smith, Military Affairs, November–December (1979), p. 186

In late 1901, Brigadier General J. Franklin Bell took command of American operations in Batangas and Laguna provinces. In response to Malvar's guerrilla warfare tactics, Bell employed counterinsurgency tactics (described by some as a scorched earth campaign) that took a heavy toll on guerrilla fighters and civilians alike. "Zones of protection" were established, and civilians were given identification papers and forced into concentration camps (called reconcentrados) which were surrounded by free-fire zones. At the Lodge Committee, in an attempt to counter the negative reception in America to General Bell's camps, Colonel Arthur Wagner, the US Army's chief public relations office, insisted the camps were to "protect friendly natives from the insurgents, and assure them an adequate food supply" while teaching them "proper sanitary standards". Wagner's assertion was undermined by a letter from a commander of one of the camps, who described them as "suburbs of Hell". Between January and April 1902, 8,350 people died in the camps out of a population of 298,000. Some camps experienced mortality rates as high as 20 percent.

Civilians became subject to a curfew, after which all persons found outside of camps without identification could be shot on sight. Many men were rounded up for questioning, tortured, and summarily executed.  Methods of torture such as the water cure were frequently employed during interrogation, and entire villages were burned or otherwise destroyed.

Filipino atrocities
U.S. Army General Otis alleged that Filipino insurgents tortured American prisoners in "fiendish fashion." According to Otis, many were buried alive or were placed up to their necks in ant hills. He claimed others had their genitals removed and stuffed into their mouths and were then executed by suffocation or bleeding to death.  Stories in other newspapers described deliberate attacks by Filipino sharpshooters upon American surgeons, chaplains, ambulances, hospitals, and wounded soldiers. An incident was described in the San Francisco Call that occurred in Escalante, Negros Occidental, where several crewmen of a landing party from the CS Recorder were fired upon and later cut into pieces by Filipino insurgents, while the insurgents were displaying a flag of truce.

It was also reported that Spanish priests were horribly mutilated before their congregations, and natives who refused to support Emilio Aguinaldo were slaughtered by the thousands. American newspaper headlines announced the "Murder and Rapine" by the "Fiendish Filipinos." General "Fighting Joe" Wheeler insisted that it was the Filipinos who had mutilated their own dead, murdered women and children, and burned down villages, solely to discredit American soldiers. Said offenses by Filipino soldiers are confirmed by Apolinario Mabini in his autobiography, which states that Filipino troops engaged in war rape and burned and looted villages, as well as stole and destroyed private property, actions which Aguinaldo did not punish soldiers for.

Other events dubbed atrocities included those attributed by the Americans to General Vicente Lukban, the Filipino commander who allegedly masterminded the Balangiga massacre in Samar province, a surprise Filipino attack that killed almost fifty American soldiers. Media reports stated that many of the bodies were mutilated.

There was testimony before the Lodge Committee that natives were given the water cure, "... in order to secure information of the murder of Private O'Herne of Company I, who had been not only killed, but roasted and otherwise tortured before death ensued."

In his History of the Filipino People Teodoro Agoncillo writes that the Filipino troops could match and even exceed American brutality on some prisoners of war. Kicking, slapping, and spitting at faces were common. In some cases, ears and noses were cut off and salt applied to the wounds. In other cases, captives were buried alive. These atrocities occurred regardless of Aguinaldo's orders and circulars concerning the good treatment of prisoners.

Worcester recounts two specific Filipino atrocities as follows: 

Campaigns of the Philippine–American War

Political atmosphere
First Philippine Commission

Colonel Charles McC. Reeve, commander of the 13th Minnesota Volunteer Infantry Regiment, opined upon returning from the Philippines in 1899 that the war was deplorable, unjustifiable, and contrary to American principles. He further stated that the war could have been prevented with conciliatory measures: 

On January 20, 1899, President McKinley appointed Jacob Gould Schurman to chair a commission, with Dean C. Worcester, Charles H. Denby, Admiral Dewey, and General Otis as members, to investigate conditions in the islands and make recommendations. Fighting subsequently erupted between U.S. and Filipino forces on February 4, and when the non-military commission members arrived in the Philippines in March, they found General Otis looking upon the commission as an infringement upon his authority.

Meetings in April with Aguinaldo's representative, Colonel Manuel Arguelles, convinced the commission that Filipinos wanted to know the specific role they would be allowed to play in the new government, and the commission requested authorization from McKinley to offer a specific plan. McKinley authorized an offer of a government consisting of "a Governor-General appointed by the President; cabinet appointed by the Governor-General; [and] a general advisory council elected by the people." McKinley also promised Filipinos "the largest measure of local self-government consistent with peace and good order," with the caveat that U.S. constitutional considerations required that the United States Congress would need to make specific rules and regulations.

A session of the Revolutionary Congress convened by Aguinaldo voted unanimously to cease fighting and accept peace on the basis of McKinley's proposal. The revolutionary cabinet headed by Apolinario Mabini was replaced on May 8 by a new "peace" cabinet headed by Pedro Paterno and Felipe Buencamino. After a meeting of the Revolutionary Congress and military commanders, Aguinaldo advised the commission that he was being advised by a new cabinet "which is more moderate and conciliatory", and appointed a delegation to meet with the Philippine Commission. At this point, General Antonio Luna, field commander of the revolutionary army, arrested Paterno and most of his cabinet. Confronted with this development, Aguinaldo withdrew his support from the peace cabinet, and Mabini and his original cabinet returned to power. Schurman, after proposing unsuccessfully to the Commission that they urge McKinley to revise his plan to increase Filipino participation, cabled the suggestion to the President as his own. McKinley instructed Secretary of State John Hay to cable Schurman that he wanted peace "preferably by kindness and conciliation", but the preference was accompanied by a threat to "send all the force necessary to suppress the insurrection if Filipino resistance continued." McKinley also polled the other members of the commission, receiving a response that "indecision now would be fatal" and urging "prosecution of the war until the insurgents submit."

After this, the commission concluded that "... The Filipinos are wholly unprepared for independence ... there being no Philippine nation, but only a collection of different peoples." In the report that they issued to McKinley the following year, the commissioners acknowledged Filipino aspirations for independence; they declared, however, that the Philippines was not ready for it. Specific recommendations included the establishment of civilian control over Manila (Otis would have veto power over the city's government), creation of civilian government as rapidly as possible, especially in areas already declared "pacified" (the American chief executive in the islands at that time was the military governor), including the establishment of a bicameral legislature, autonomous governments on the provincial and municipal levels, and a system of free public elementary schools.

On November 2, 1900, Dr. Schurman signed the following statement:

Second Philippine Commission

The Second Philippine Commission, appointed by President McKinley on March 16, 1900, and headed by William Howard Taft, was granted legislative as well as limited executive powers. On September 1, the Taft Commission began to exercise legislative functions. Between September 1900 and August 1902, it issued 499 laws. The commission established a civil service and a judicial system which included a Supreme Court, and a legal code was drawn up to replace obsolete Spanish ordinances. The 1901 municipal code provided for popularly elected presidents, vice presidents, and councilors to serve on municipal boards. The municipal board members were responsible for collecting taxes, maintaining municipal properties, and undertaking necessary construction projects; they also elected provincial governors.

American opposition
Some Americans, notably William Jennings Bryan, Mark Twain, Andrew Carnegie, Ernest Crosby, and other members of the American Anti-Imperialist League, strongly objected to the annexation of the Philippines. Anti-imperialist movements claimed that the United States had become a colonial power, by replacing Spain as the colonial power in the Philippines.

Some anti-imperialists opposed annexation on racist grounds. Among these was Senator Benjamin Tillman of South Carolina, who feared that annexation of the Philippines would lead to an influx of non-white immigrants into the United States. Others worried that annexing the Philippines would lead to the non-white population having a say in American government.

As news of atrocities committed in subduing the Philippines arrived in the United States, support for the war flagged.

 Mark Twain 
Mark Twain famously opposed the war by using his influence in the press. He said the war betrayed the ideals of American democracy by not allowing the Filipino people to choose their own destiny.

In a diary passage removed by Twain's first biographical editor Albert Bigelow Paine, Twain refers to American troops as "our uniformed assassins" and describes their killing of "six hundred helpless and weaponless savages" in the Philippines as "a long and happy picnic with nothing to do but sit in comfort and fire the Golden Rule into those people down there and imagine letters to write home to the admiring families, and pile glory upon glory."

Filipino collaboration

Some of Aguinaldo's associates supported America, even before hostilities began. Pedro Paterno, Aguinaldo's prime minister and the author of the 1897 armistice treaty with Spain, advocated the incorporation of the Philippines into the United States in 1898. Other associates sympathetic to the U.S. were Trinidad Pardo de Tavera and Benito Legarda, prominent members of Congress; Gregorio Araneta, Aguinaldo's Secretary of Justice; and Felipe Buencamino, Aguinaldo's Secretary of Foreign Affairs. Buencamino is recorded to have said in 1902: "I am an American and all the money in the Philippines, the air, the light, and the sun I consider American." Many such people subsequently held posts in the colonial government.

U.S. Army Captain Matthew Arlington Batson formed the Macabebe Scouts as a native guerrilla force to fight the insurgency.

Aftermath

Post-1902 conflicts

After military rule was terminated on July 4, 1902, the Philippine Constabulary was established as an archipelago-wide police force to control brigandage and deal with the remnants of the insurgent movement. The Philippine Constabulary gradually took over the responsibility for suppressing hostile forces' activities from United States Army units. Remnants of Aguinaldo's Republic, and remnants or holdovers of the Katipunan organization which had predated the American presence, and other resistance groups all remained active, fighting the United States military or Philippine Constabulary for nearly a decade after the official end of the war. After the close of the war, however, Governor General Taft preferred to rely on the Philippine Constabulary and to treat the "Irreconcilables" as a law enforcement concern rather than a military concern requiring the involvement of the American army. Thus the actions of these remaining guerrilla resistance movements were labeled as brigandage or banditry, and dismissed by the American government as bandits, fanatics and cattle rustlers.

In 1902, Macario Sakay established the Republika ng Katagalugan, claiming to succeed the First Philippine Republic, in Morong along Katipunan lines as opposed to Aguinaldo's Republic. This republic ended in 1906 when Sakay and his top followers surrendered upon being offered amnesty by the American authorities, but instead were arrested, and executed the following year.

Beginning in 1903, brigandage by organized groups became a problem in some of the outlying provinces in the Visayas. Among these groups were the Pulahan (Spanish: Pulajanes), who were from the highlands of Samar and Leyte. The term is derived from the native word pula, meaning "red", as they were distinguished by the red garments they wore. The Pulajanes subscribed to a blend of Roman Catholic and folk beliefs. For example, they believed certain amulets called agimat would render them bulletproof. The last of these groups were defeated or had surrendered to the Philippine Constabulary by 1911.

The American government had signed the Kiram-Bates Treaty with the Sultanate of Sulu at the outbreak of the war, that was supposed to prevent resistance in that part of the Philippines (which included parts of Mindanao, the Sulu Archipelago, Palawan and Sabah). However, after the Filipino resistance in Luzon and the Visayas collapsed, the United States canceled the treaty, and began to colonize Moro land, which provoked the Moro Rebellion. Beginning with the Battle of Bayan in May 1902. In March 1906, 800-900 Moros were killed in the First Battle of Bud Dajo, also known as the Moro Crater Massacre. The rebellion continued until the Battle of Bud Bagsak in June 1913, which marked the end of this conflict; negotiations between the US authorities and Sulu Sultanate continued until the latter's dissolution in March 1915.

A 1907 law prohibited the display of flags and other symbols "used during the late insurrection in the Philippine Islands". Some historians consider these unofficial extensions to be part of the war.

Cultural impact
The influence of the Roman Catholic Church was reduced when the secular United States Government disestablished the Church and purchased and redistributed Church lands, one of the earliest attempts at land reform in the Philippines. The purchase was completed on December 22, 1903, at a sale price of $7,239,784.66. The land redistribution program was stipulated in at least three laws: the Philippine Organic Act, the Public Lands Act, and the Friar Lands Act. Section 10 of the Public Land Act limited purchases to a maximum of 16 hectares for an individual or 1024 hectares for a corporation or like association. Land was also offered for lease to landless farmers, at prices ranging from fifty centavos to one peso and fifty centavos per hectare per annum. Section 28 of the Public lands Act stipulated that lease contracts may run for a maximum period of 25 years, renewable for another 25 years.

In 1901 at least five hundred teachers (365 males and 165 females) arrived from the U.S. aboard the U.S. Army Transport Thomas. The name Thomasite was adopted for these teachers, who firmly established education as one of America's major contributions to the Philippines. Among the assignments given were Albay, Catanduanes, Camarines Norte, Camarines Sur, Sorsogon, and Masbate, which are the present day Bicol Region, which is also the region which was heavily resistant to American rule. Twenty-seven of the original Thomasites either died of tropical diseases or were murdered by Filipino rebels during their first 20 months of residence. Despite the hardships, the Thomasites persisted, teaching and building learning institutions that prepared students for their chosen professions or trades. They opened the Philippine Normal School (now Philippine Normal University) and the Philippine School of Arts and Trades (PSAT) in 1901 and reopened the Philippine Nautical School, established in 1839 by the Board of Commerce of Manila under Spain. By the end of 1904, primary courses were mostly taught by Filipinos under American supervision.

In the media
In the Philippines, the 2008 film Baler, the 2010 film Amigo, the 2012 film El Presidente, the 2015 film Heneral Luna and its 2018 sequel, Goyo: The Boy General are based on the war. The film Sakay portrays the latter part of the life of Filipino patriot and hero Macario Sakay. The film Malvar: Tuloy ang Laban is a biographical film about the life of Emilio Aguinaldo; it has been in development since 2000 and, is pending release. the 1985 film Virgin Forest is set during the war and involves the capture of Emilio Aguinaldo.

The 1945 film Los últimos de Filipinas and the 2016 film 1898, Los últimos de Filipinas depict the siege of Baler.

In the U,S., the 1926 film Across the Pacific and the 1949 film Last Stand in the Philippines are about or are set against a background of the war. The 1939 film The Real Glory is set against the backdrop of the Moro Rebellion during the American occupation of the Philippines beginning in 1906.

Philippine independence and sovereignty (1946)

On January 20, 1899, President McKinley appointed the First Philippine Commission (the Schurman Commission), a five-person group headed by Dr. Jacob Schurman, president of Cornell University, to investigate conditions in the islands and make recommendations. In the report that they issued to the president the following year, the commissioners acknowledged Filipino aspirations for independence; they declared, however, that the Philippines was not ready for it. Specific recommendations included the establishment of civilian government as rapidly as possible (the American chief executive in the islands at that time was the military governor), including establishment of a bicameral legislature, autonomous governments on the provincial and municipal levels, and a new system of free public elementary schools.

From the very beginning, United States presidents and their representatives in the islands defined their colonial mission as tutelage: preparing the Philippines for eventual independence. Except for a small group of "retentionists", the issue was not whether the Philippines would be granted self-rule, but when and under what conditions. Thus political development in the islands was rapid and particularly impressive in light of the complete lack of representative institutions under the Spanish. The Philippine Organic Act of July 1902 stipulated that, with the achievement of peace, a legislature would be established composed of a lower house, the Philippine Assembly, which would be popularly elected, and an upper house consisting of the Philippine Commission, which was to be appointed by the president of the United States.

The Jones Act, passed by the U.S. Congress in 1916 to serve as the new organic law in the Philippines, promised eventual independence and instituted an elected Philippine senate. The Tydings–McDuffie Act (officially the Philippine Independence Act; Public Law 73–127) approved on March 24, 1934, provided for self-government of the Philippines and for Filipino independence (from the United States) after a period of ten years. World War II intervened, bringing the Japanese occupation between 1941 and 1945. In 1946, the Treaty of Manila between the governments of the U.S. and the Republic of the Philippines provided for the recognition of the independence of the Republic of the Philippines and the relinquishment of American sovereignty over the Philippine Islands.

See also
 Campaigns of the Philippine–American War
 Foreign interventions by the United States
 Anti-Americanism in the Philippines
 History of the Philippines (1898–1946)
 List of Philippine–American War Medal of Honor recipients
 Philippines–United States relations
 Timeline of the Philippine–American War
 United States involvement in regime change

Notes

References

 
 
 
 
 
 
 
 
 
  (note: page number info in short footnotes citing this work may be incorrect—work is underway to correct this)
 
 
 
 
 .
 
 . (English translation by Sulpicio Guevara.)
 
 
 
 
 
 
 
 
 
 
 
 
 
 "Race-Making and Colonial Violence in the U.S. Empire: The Philippine–American War as Race War," Diplomatic History, Vol. 30, No. 2 (April 2006), 169–210. (version at Japanfocus.org).
 
 
 
 
 
 
 
  See also Moorfield Storey and Julian Codman (1902). Secretary Root's Record:"Marked Severities" in Philippine Warfare – Wikisource.
 
 
 (Introduction, Decolonizing the History of the Philippine–American War, by Paul A. Kramer dated December 8, 2005)
 
 
 
 
 

Further reading

 
 
 
 Legarda, Benito J. Jr. (2001). The Hills of Sampaloc: the Opening Actions of the Philippine–American War, February 4–5, 1899. Makati: Bookmark. .
 Stewart, Richard W. General Editor, Ch. 16, Transition, Change, and the Road to war, 1902–1917" , in "American Military History, Volume I: The United States Army and the Forging of a Nation, 1775–1917" , Center of Military History, United States Army, .
 Stratemeyer, Edward. (1898). Under Dewey at Manila – Wikisource.
 Stratemeyer, Edward (as Ralph Bonehill). (1899). A Sailor Boy with Dewey – Wikisource.
 Stratemeyer, Edward. (1900). The Campaign of the Jungle – Wikisource.
 Stratemeyer, Edward. (1901). Under MacArthur in Luzon – Wikisource.
 The "Lodge Committee" (a.k.a. Philippine Investigating Committee) hearings and a great deal of documentation were published in three volumes (3000 pages) as S. Doc. 331, 57th Cong., 1st Session An abridged version of the oral testimony can be found in: American Imperialism and the Philippine Insurrection: Testimony Taken from Hearings on Affairs in the Philippine Islands before the Senate Committee on the Philippines—1902; edited by Henry F Graff; Publisher: Little, Brown; 1969.
  
 Wilcox, Marrion. Harper's History of the War. Harper, New York and London 1900, reprinted 1979. [Alternate title: Harper's History of the War in the Philippines]. Also reprinted in the Philippines by Vera-Reyes.

External links

 The American Peril – An Examination of the Spanish–American War and the Philippine Insurrection by Dan Carlin
 War Arnaldo Dumindin
 Images from the Philippine-United States War historicaltextarchive.com
 Philippine Centennial Celebration MSC Computer Training Center.
 The Matter of the Philippines, from Birth of an American Empire, 
 (Spanish) (archived from the original on 2006-10-15)
 A brief description of the war between the United States and the Philippines, which began in 1899.
 by Mariano "Anong" Santos, Pinoy Newsmagazine, August 2006 (archived on 2008-02-13)
 "Imperial Amnesia" by John B. Judis, Foreign Policy, July/August 2004
 The Philippine Revolutionary Records at 'Filipiniana.net (archived on 2009-05-25).
 (archived on 2011-05-11)
 (archived on 2011-05-11)
 of Philippine–American War
 Booknotes interview with Stanley Karnow on In Our Image: America's Empire in the Philippines'', May 28, 1989.
 No. 15 Spanish 12-pounder  Photo of a bronze cannon captured by the Americans in Manila.
 Philippine–American War – 1899–1902 (videos)
 
 Spanish–American War Reenactment Groups

 
Conflicts in 1899
Conflicts in 1900
Conflicts in 1901
Conflicts in 1902
History of the Philippines (1898–1946)
Guerrilla wars
1899 in the United States
1900 in the United States
1901 in the United States
1902 in the United States
Invasions by the United States
Rebellions in the Philippines
Philippines–United States military relations
Wars involving the Philippines
Wars involving the United States
Wars of independence